Luciobarbus pallaryi is a ray-finned fish species in the family Cyprinidae. It is found in Algeria and Morocco.

Its natural habitat is freshwater springs. It is not considered a threatened species by the IUCN.

The taxonomy and systematics of the Maghreb barbs are subject to considerable dispute. Some authors consider L. pallaryi a distinct species, while others include it in the Algerian barb (L. callensis). Some authorities consider Barbus lepineyi to be conspecific with L. pallaryi when the latter is considered a distinct species.

References

 

pallaryi
Cyprinid fish of Africa
Taxa named by Jacques Pellegrin
Fish described in 1919
Taxonomy articles created by Polbot